Inflammatory may refer to:

 Inflammation, a biological response to harmful stimuli
 The word inflammatory is also used to refer literally to fire and flammability, and figuratively in relation to comments that are provocative and arouse passions and emotions.
 An objection (United States law)